Evers is a Low German and Dutch patronymic surname meaning "son of Evert/Everhard" (High German Eberhard, English Everard). Variants include Everse, Everts and Evertsz.  In 2000, there were fewer than 10,000 people sharing the Evers surname among 306 million people in the United States at the time.

Notable people with the surname include:

 Albert Evers (1868 – c. 1890), English footballer
 Alfonso Delgado Evers (born 1942), Argentinian clergyman, Archbishop of San Juan de Cuyo (2000–2017)
 Alf Evers (1905–2004), US historian
 Bettina Evers (born 1981), German ice hockey forward
 Bill Evers (born 1954), American baseball player and coach
 Bloeme Evers-Emden (born 1926), Dutch child psychologist
 Bram Evers (1886–1952), Dutch track athlete
 Brenny Evers (born 1978), Dutch footballer
 Brooke Evers (born 1985),  Australian television personality
 Caroline Evers-Swindell (born 1978), New Zealand rower
 Charles Evers (1922–2020), US civil rights activist, brother of Medgar Evers
 Christopher Evers (1564–1590), English Catholic martyred priest (also known as Christopher Bales)
 David Evers (born 1954), US Wildfowl carving artist
 Denis Evers (1913–2007), English cricketer and WWII pilot
 Diane Evers (born 1956), Australian tennis player
 Diane Evers (politician) (born  1963), Australian politician, Member of the Western Australian Legislative Council (from 2017)
 Edvard Evers (1853–1919), Swedish Lutheran priest and hymnwriter
 Edwin Evers (born 1971), Dutch drummer and radio presenter
 Edwin Evers (fisherman) (born 1974), American bass fisherman
 Floris Evers (born 1983), Dutch field hockey player
 Frank Evers (disambiguation)
 Georgina Evers-Swindell (born 1978), New Zealand rower
 Greg Evers (1955–2017), US politician
 Guy Evers (1874–1959), English rugby union player
 Harold Evers (1876–1937), Australian cricketer
 Hoot Evers (1921–1991), US baseball player
 Jason Evers (1922–2005), US actor
 Joe Evers (Joseph Francis Evers; 1891–1949), American baseball player
 Johnny Evers (1883–1947), US baseball player
 Jürgen Evers (born 1964), German track athlete
 Kai-Bastian Evers (born 1990), German footballer
 Karin Evers-Meyer (born 1949), German politician
 L. H. Evers (Leonard Herbert Evers; 1926–1985), Australian writer
 Lance Evers (born 1969), Canadian professional wrestler better known as Lance Storm
 Lisa Evers (born 1963), US television personality
 Maike Evers (born 1980), Australian fashion model and television personality
 Marc Evers (born 1991), Dutch Paralympic swimmer
 Matt Evers (born 1976), US figure skater
 Medgar Evers (1925–1963), US civil rights activist
 Meike Evers (born 1977), German rower
 Mervyn Evers, Archdeacon of Lahore (1940–1944)
 Myrlie Evers-Williams (born 1933), US civil rights activist, widow of Medgar Evers
 Nick Evers (1937–2013), Australian politician
 Nico Evers-Swindell (born 1979), New Zealand actor
 Raphael Evers (born 1954), Dutch Rabbi
 Reinbert Evers (born 1949), German musician
 Richard Evers (born 1959), Canadian publisher, programmer, technology consultant and author
 Sean Evers (born 1977), English footballer
 Sean Evers (born 1975), American Tattoo Artist
 Shoshanna Evers (born 1980), American author of contemporary and erotic romance novels and novellas
 Stuart Evers (born 1976), British novelist, short story writer and critic
 Sybil Evers (1904–1963), English singer and actress
 Ties Evers (born 1991), Dutch footballer
 Tom Evers (1852–1925), American baseball player
 Tony Evers (born 1951), US politician and educator
 Williamson Evers (born c. 1949), US education activist, educator, politician

Fictional characters
 Bob Evers, main character of a 35-volume children's book series by Willy van der Heide
 Lily Evers, maiden name of Harry Potter's mother in the Dutch translation ("Evans" in original)
 Jim Evers, a character in the 2003 film The Haunted Mansion
 Tony "Duke" Evers, character in "Rocky" series of films
Michael Evers, a character in the film TiMER
Susan Evers Hayley Mills & Mitch Evers Brian Keith; One of the twin sisters, and the father of the twins, in the original Disney movie The Parent Trap (1961)

See also
Jan Everse Sr (1922–1974), Dutch footballer
Jan Everse (born 1954), Dutch footballer
Ever (disambiguation)
Everts (disambiguation)
Ewers

References 

Dutch-language surnames
Patronymic surnames